Auguste-Louis-Désiré Boulé (1 September 1799, in Paris – 3 July 1865, in Paris) was a 19th-century French playwright.

A secretary at the Théâtre des Variétés, his plays were presented on the most significant Parisian stages of his time including the Théâtre de l'Ambigu, the Théâtre de la Porte-Saint-Martin, the Théâtre du Panthéon and the Théâtre de la Gaîté.

Œuvres 

1822: L'Inconnu, ou les Mystères, melodrama in 3 acts, with Morisot
1832: Les 20.000 francs, drama in 1 act mingled with songs, with Charles Potier
1833: La Fille du bourreau, folie-vaudeville in 1 act, with Potier
1834: Trois ans après, ou la Sommation respectueuse, drama in 4 acts, with Théodore Nézel
1835: Le bon ange, ou Chacun ses torts, drame-vaudeville in 1 act, with Eugène Cormon
1835: Le Facteur, ou la Justice des hommes, drama in 5 acts, with Charles Desnoyer and Potier
1835: La Tache de sang, drama in 3 acts
1836: Fanchette, ou l'Amour d'une femme, drame-vaudeville in 2 acts, with Potier
1836: Parce que, ou la Suite de Pourquoi ? , comédie-vaudeville in 1 act, with Potier
1836: Le Passé, ou A tout péché miséricorde, comédie-vaudeville en 1 act, with Cormon
1836: Le Prévôt de Paris (1369), drama in 3 acts, with Cormon
1837: L'honneur de ma mère, drama in 3 acts, with Rimbaut
1837: Rita l'espagnole, drama in 4 acts, with Chabot de Bouin, Desnoyer and Eugène Sue
1837: Le Domino bleu, comédie-vaudeville in 1 act, with Félix Dutertre de Véteuil
1837: Rose Ménard, ou Trop bonne mère, drama in 3 acts
1838: Adriane Ritter, drama in 5 acts, with Jules Chabot de Bouin
1839: Corneille et Richelieu, comédie-vaudeville in 1 act, with Rimbaut
1839: Giuseppo, drama in 5 acts, with Chabot de Bouin
1839: Paul Darbois, drama in 3 acts
1840: Denise, ou l'Avis du ciel, drama in 5 acts, with Rimbaut
1840: Paula, drama in 5 acts, with  Chabot de Bouin
1841: Le Bourreau des crânes, vaudeville in 2 acts
1841: Paul et Virginie, drama in 5 acts and 6 tableaux, with Cormon
1842: Émery le négociant, drama in 3 acts, with Hippolyte Rimbaut
1843: Les Naufrageurs de Kérougal, drama in 4 acts, extravaganza, with Chabot de Bouin and Saint-Yves
1844: Jeanne, drama in 6 parts and 2 periods, with Chabot de Bouin and Saint-Ernest
1845: Les Enfants du facteur, drama in 3 acts
1845: Les Ruines de Vaudémont, drama in 4 acts, with Aristide Letorzec
1845: Stephen ou le fils du prescrit, drama in 4 acts, with Auguste Anicet-Bourgeois
1846: Les Trompettes de Chamboran, vaudeville in 3 acts and 4 tableaux, with Théodore de Lustières
1848: Les Œuvres du démon, melodrama in 5 acts, with Jules Brésil

Bibliography 
 Gustave Vapereau, Dictionnaire universel des contemporains, 1865,  

19th-century French dramatists and playwrights
Writers from Paris
1799 births
1865 deaths